Rootfire Cooperative is a not-for-profit record label that was created in 2016, which specializes in zero interest micro loans for bands. It is a partnership between Rootfire and Ineffable Music Group. Artists maintain 100% ownership of their music. The microloan program is also supported by merchandise and music shows.

Background

“Launched in the spring of 2016, Rootfire Cooperative is a partnership between Rootfire and Ineffable Music Group that offers interest-free microloans to artists.” – as featured in Forbes, Aug 22, 2017. The intention behind developing the label services program was to provide interest-free loans for the production and marketing of recorded music.

The Movement’s album Golden was the first release on Rootfire Cooperative, followed by albums from HIRIE, Giant Panda Guerilla Dub Squad, The Holdup, Satsang, and Nattali Rize.

In April 2016, the label released their first album by The Movement titled Golden which hit #1 in the Billboard and iTunes Reggae charts 

In August 2016, they released Hirie's sophomore album Wandering Soul. The album topped the Reggae Billboard chart and was the first time a female reggae artist topped the chart since Joss Stone's album "Water" from August 2015.

In September 2016, the label released their third Billboard topping album titled Make It Better by Giant Panda Guerilla Dub Squad. The album debut at #1 on Billboard's Reggae chart.

In 2017, Rootfire Cooperative released  Rebel Frequency by Nattali Rize, followed by "Pyramid(s)" from Satsang, topping the Billboard Reggae chart for a fourth time in the label's first year of operation.

Official Rootfire Cooperative Records releases
Steel Pulse – Mass Manipulation – TBD
The Elovaters – Defy Gravity – October 26, 2018
 For Peace Band – Always Love – July 27, 2018
 The Expanders – Blood Morning – January 23, 2018 
 Thunder Body – Solstice - October 13, 2017
Nattali Rize – Rebel Frequency - March 24, 2017 
 Satsang – Pyramid(s) March 20, 2017
The Holdup – Leaves In The Pool - December 1, 2016 
Giant Panda Guerilla Dub Squad – Make It Better - September 16, 2016 
 HIRIE – Wandering Soul - August 19, 2016 
The Movement (reggae band) – Golden - April 8, 2016

References

External links
 Official website

American record labels
Record labels established in 2016